This article describes the English racing driver. For the English poet, see Henry Austin Dobson.

Austin Dobson (19 August 1912 in Lodsworth, Sussex – 13 March 1963 in Cuckfield, Sussex) was a racing driver from England.   He was the brother of Arthur Charles Dobson, who was also a racing driver.

In 1936 he drove an Alfa Romeo P3 to 6th place in the first Hungarian Grand Prix.

References

1912 births
1963 deaths
English racing drivers
Grand Prix drivers
People from Lodsworth
People from Cuckfield